Doug Herbert Mitchell is a former offensive lineman who played eight seasons in the Canadian Football League, winning three Grey Cups.

A born in the United Kingdom, Mitchell took to Canadian football and starred with the Western Ontario Mustangs. He began his pro career with the Hamilton Tiger-Cats, playing 8 seasons, 98 games and 2 Grey Cup championships. He finished his final year with 8 games with the Montreal Alouettes, and won his final Grey Cup in 1974.

His brother is CFL player Bill Mitchell.

External links
CFLAPEDIA BIO
FANBASE BIO

1942 births
Canadian football offensive linemen
Western Mustangs football players
Living people
Montreal Alouettes players
Hamilton Tiger-Cats players
English players of Canadian football